Backhouse's constant is a mathematical constant named after Nigel Backhouse. Its value is approximately 1.456 074 948.

It is defined by using the power series such that the coefficients of successive terms are the prime numbers,
 
and its multiplicative inverse as a formal power series,
 
Then:
 .

This limit was conjectured to exist by Backhouse, and later proven by Philippe Flajolet.

References

Further reading

Mathematical constants
Prime numbers